The 24 cm Mörser M 98 was a heavy siege howitzer used by Austria-Hungary during World War I. It was designed to attack modern fortifications, but its short range and ineffective ammunition led to the development of the more deservedly famous 30.5 cm Mörser M 11 and M 16.

History
Based on a Krupp 1888–1890 design, Skoda developed a new heavy mortar on a middle pivot mounting for testing in 1896.  However, the authorities realised that advancing technology required a newer design using a barrel in a cradle mounted on a hydraulic recoil system.  While introduced in November 1900, it wasn't quite ready and went through a number of minor improvements. One major problem was weak recoil springs that would allow the barrel to slip out of its cradle while elevated. Leather and horsehair stoppers could be wedged in the cradle as a short-term fix. But the permanent fix had to wait until the M 98/7 version that extended the jacket surrounding the barrel to the muzzle and redesigned the cradle was produced after 1907.

It was notable as the first weapon with a modern recoil system to see service with the Austro-Hungarian artillery as well as the first design to require motor traction. It was broken down into four loads for this purpose. Its carriage was mounted on a static firing platform that was jacked up and down onto its prepared bedding. It could only be loaded at 0° elevation.

BL 9.45 inch Howitzer in United Kingdom service
The UK bought 4 guns held in stock by Skoda in Pilsen in February 1900 and designated the gun  Ordnance BL 9.45 inch Howitzer Mk I. The purchase action by Sir Henry Brackenbury served two purposes, to thwart a German agent acting on behalf of the Boers and to provide a capability for use against the forts around Pretoria. They were sent to South Africa for use in the Second Boer War against the Pretoria forts but were not needed, reportedly they fired one round at Boers attacking a picquet outside Pretoria. They were later sent to China during the Boxer Rebellion but were also not used in action there.

They were returned to UK from China and each of the two siege companies fired 100 rounds from them but they had not been regarded seriously. However, they were issued to the new third siege company and used for annual practice where numerous defects became clear. Minor modifications were made but the critical defect, no elevation below 42 degrees, giving a high trajectory, made accurate fire impossible with the methods of the time.

Notes

References 
 Headlam, Major-General Sir John. The History of the Royal Artillery from the Indian Mutiny to the Great War - Volume 2 (1899 - 1914). Woolwich, Royal Artillery Institution, 1934
 I.V. Hogg & L.F. Thurston, British Artillery Weapons & Ammunition 1914–1918. London: Ian Allan, 1972.
 Ortner, M. Christian. The Austro-Hungarian Artillery From 1867 to 1918: Technology, Organization, and Tactics. Vienna, Verlag Militaria, 2007

External links

 Handbook for the 9.45-inch B.L. howitzer, 1906 Hosted online by State Library of Victoria, Australia
 M 98 on Landships

World War I howitzers
240 mm artillery
World War I artillery of Austria-Hungary
Siege artillery